Concord High School is a public high school in Dunlap, a census-designated place in Elkhart County, Indiana, United States.

It serves Dunlap, small sections of southern Elkhart and a small section of northern Goshen.

Statistics
In the 2020-21 school year, total enrollment is at 1,679 students.

Concord High School has a diverse student population with Hispanic being the largest minority population. In the 2021-22 school year the ethnicity breakdown was:
White - 44.0%
Hispanic - 41.5%
Black - 7.9%
Asian - 1.0%
Multi-racial - 5.4%

History
The school was host to President Barack Obama's first order of business meeting outside of Washington, D.C., as well as the site of one of his campaign rallies before the 2008 election.

Music 
Concord's music department includes several choirs, two string orchestras, two jazz bands, four concert bands, one of the largest pep bands in the area, and a championship marching band.

The marching band is known as the Concord Marching Minutemen. Since the inception of the ISSMA marching band state finals in 1983, the band has only failed to qualify for the state championship twice, in 2000 and again in 2019. The band holds ISSMA Class B state championship titles from 1992, 2003, 2005, 2011 and 2015 The book "American Band" by Kristen Laine follows the Marching Minutemen through their 2004 state runner-up season.

The marching band has appeared in the Rose Bowl, Fiesta Bowl, and Orange Bowl parades and was in the Macy's Thanksgiving Day Parade in 1974, 1978, 1985, 1992, 1997, 2007, and 2013.

Concord High School was the first high school recognized by Conn-Selmer as an All-American school, an award to "recognize the most outstanding high school instrumental music programs in America."

Athletics

Concord High School offers various sports, including football, cross country, golf, tennis, soccer, basketball, wrestling, swimming, track and field, baseball, lacrosse, and hockey for boys, and volleyball, cross country, soccer, tennis, cheerleading, swimming, track and field, softball, and lacrosse for girls.

Concord's athletic teams compete in the Northern Lakes Conference and in the 5A classification, competing in Sectional 10 in football and Sectional 4 in all other class sports.

Drama department
Concord's drama department produces a straight play and a musical in November and March, respectively, held in the Beickman Performing Arts Center.

Notable alumni
Dairese Gary, Former NCAA basketball player for the New Mexico Lobos men's basketball team
Franko House, basketball player and American football tight end
Shawn Kemp, Former NBA basketball player for the Seattle SuperSonics, Cleveland Cavaliers, Portland Trail Blazers and Orlando Magic.
Jason Spriggs, offensive lineman in the National Football League, selected by the Green Bay Packers in the 2nd round of the 2016 NFL Draft
Zach Horner, News Reporter at local NBC affiliate WNDU-TV.

See also
 List of high schools in Indiana

References

External links
Concord High School Home Page

Public high schools in Indiana
Schools in Elkhart County, Indiana
1926 establishments in Indiana
Buildings and structures in Elkhart, Indiana